Sari Kand-e MohammadAli (also Romanized as Sārī Kand-e MohammadAli; also known as Sārī Kand, Sārī Kand-e Pā’īn, and Sārī Kand-e Soflá) is a village in Chaypareh-ye Pain Rural District, Zanjanrud District, Zanjan County, Zanjan Province, Iran. At the 2006 census, its population was 101, in 23 families.

References 

Populated places in Zanjan County